A captain of an Australian rules football team, sometimes known as a skipper, is a player who, during the course of a match and off the field, has several additional roles and responsibilities over and above those of a regular player.

As an on-field leader, they are second to the coach and have various roles, including to inspire the players and sometimes address umpires and the media.

When a coach appoints multiple captains, the following captaincy roles may be appointed.
 Co-captain (multiple captains)
 Vice-captain (is second to the captain)
 Deputy vice-captain (is used only when both captain and vice-captain are injured)

Captain's responsibilities

The toss
Before the start of a match, a coin toss between the captains is used to determine which end of the ground each team will kick to. The away captain calls the coin toss, and the winning captain makes the choice of scoring end (direction). The decision usually depends on the weather conditions and the weather forecast—particularly the direction and strength of the wind, which can give a significant advantage to a team. The wind can be such a strong advantage that Legendary AFL coach Kevin Sheedy (who was known for his cunning), coaching for Essendon, was alleged to have orchestrated the tying down of the windsock at the aptly named Windy Hill on a particularly bultery day; their opponents, bemused by the tied-down windsock, chose to kick against the win.

Addressing the players
Before the game and during the quarter- and half-time breaks, a captain will be asked by the coach to address the players in a huddle after the coach address. Whereas the coach address typically discusses strategy and field positions, the captain's address is usually purely motivational.

Umpires
The captain is the only player on the ground who is allowed to address an umpire to question or discuss a decision. Any other player who does so can be penalised or reported. However, a captain may also be penalised or reported if they become abusive.

The umpires will typically visit the rooms of each team before a game and introduce themselves to the captain and advise the captains on any rule interpretations that they will be strict on and what they will and won't tolerate on the field, although this depends on the level of the league (among other factors).

Media
The captain will often take a public role in media relations on behalf of the team. At AFL level, captains receive media training to extend their professionalism off the field.

Team selection
Although not always, the captain may be asked to participate on the selection committee to determine which players do or do not make the squad.

Representative for the playing group
The captain and the leadership group represents the playing group. If a player does something to the detriment of the playing group (such as inappropriate behaviour like taking drugs), then the captain will often act in the interests of the playing group and request that the club or league take appropriate action.

Head count
The captain of the team may request the game to be stopped for a head count, to determine whether or not the opposition team is fielding too many players. Head counts are exceedingly rare. As of August 2022, the last head count at AFL level was by  captain Guy McKenna against St Kilda in Round 22, 1999; the call was unsuccessful.

Grand Final
It is tradition after a grand final that the winning captain and coach hold up the premiership cup before it is handed to the players. Both the winning and losing captains are expected to make a speech, including paying respect to the opposition team.

Australian Football League premiership captains
See: List of Australian Football League premiership captains and coaches

See also

Captain (sports)

References

Australian rules football terminology
Leadership positions in sports
Sports captains